Kurt Johannessen (born 4 December 1933) is a Norwegian former sports shooter. He competed in the 50 metre pistol event at the 1960 Summer Olympics.

References

1933 births
Living people
Norwegian male sport shooters
Olympic shooters of Norway
Shooters at the 1960 Summer Olympics
Sportspeople from Oslo